George Miller (June 28, 1941 – March 5, 2003), born George Wade Dornberger, was a stand-up comedian.

He first performed standup at age 21, starting in Seattle and eventually in the late 1960's moving onto Southern California & Los Angeles comedy clubs, making his network television debut on The Tonight Show in 1976.

He appeared on national television programs several times through the 1970s, 1980s, and 1990s; in particular appearing on NBC's Late Night with David Letterman and CBS' Late Show with David Letterman 56 times in two decades. He was a friend to many in the West Coast comedy scene who later enjoyed tremendous success, including David Letterman, Robin Williams, Jay Leno and Jerry Seinfeld.

Miller died in 2003 aged 61 at UCLA Medical Center after a long bout with leukemia, from a blood clot in his brain. Letterman reportedly paid for Miller's medical expenses throughout his battle with leukemia, including a major donation to UCLA so Miller could be admitted into an experimental treatment program. Letterman also reportedly paid for Miller's funeral expenses (though was unable to attend due to being hospitalized for a severe case of shingles).

Notes

External links

Norm Macdonald and Letterman on their Favorite Comedian: George Miller

1941 births
2003 deaths
American stand-up comedians
American male comedians
20th-century American comedians
21st-century American comedians
Comedians from Washington (state)
Deaths from leukemia
Deaths from cancer in California